Lubna Marium (born 8 July 1954) is a Bangladeshi dancer, art director, researcher and cultural activist.

Biography 
She participated in the Liberation War of 1971 by assisting in the Advanced Dressing Center located at the Mohdipur Mukti Bahini Camp of Sector 7, near Chapainawabganj. She was also associated with the ‘Mukti-Shongrami Shilpi Shongstha’, an artists’ group formed in Kolkata during the Liberation War of Bangladesh in 1971.

From 1999 to 2005 Marium Sanskrit dance in India, after which time she returned to Bangladesh to promote  dance in Bangladesh.

The Government of Bangladesh awarded her the Shilpakala Padak award in 2019 for her special contribution to dance. She can be seen in the popular documentary film Muktir Gaan.

Personal life 
Lubna is married to Jamal Ahmed Sufi, Managing Director of Charuta Private Ltd. Lubna’s father Quazi Nooruzzaman, a valiant military officer and the Commander of Sector-7 during the Liberation War in 1971, was a prominent leftist political thinker. and her mother Dr. Sultana Zaman Professor Emeritus of the University of Dhaka, was the founder of Bangladesh Protibandhi Foundation (BPF), an organization for the mentally disadvantaged population of Bangladesh. Dr. Sultana Zaman was awarded Begum Rokeya Padak in 2008 by the Government of Bangladesh. Her daughter Anusheh Anadil is a Bangladeshi musician, artist, cultural activist. Lubna’s son, Kushan Omar Sufi, is a designer and musician.

Education
Lubna Marium passed Secondary School Certificate (SSC) from Dhaka board in 1969 form Holy Cross Girls' High School (Dhaka). In 1971, She completed Higher Secondary School Certificate (HSC) from Holy Cross College, Dhaka. In 1977, She completed her BA degree from Dr. Hari Singh Gour University. She completed MA in Theatre & Performance Studies form York University, Canada in 2020. She also has some Extra-Curricular Certificates. In 1969, she obtained a Certificate in Dance from Bulbul Lalitakala Academy,Dhaka. In 1980, Certificate in Secretarial Science, Dhaka. In 2000, a Certificate in Spoken Sanskrit from Samskrita Bharati. Delhi, India.

Cultural And Social Activism

Lubna has been part of Bangladesh’s Cultural Movement from childhood. Before the war in 1971 she participated in many demonstrations, rallies and cultural performances protesting oppression by the Pakistani regime. In 1971, with her family, she worked in the Kalyani Refugee Camp in India, under the aegis of the Center for Communal Harmony run by the late Smt. Maitreyee Devi. Later, she was part of the Advanced Dressing Center in Sector 7 of the Mukti Bahini, where her father Lt.Col. Nooruzzaman was the Sector Commander the Founding Member of Ekattorer Ghatak Dalal Nirmul Committee. She can be seen in the film ‘Muktir Gaan’ as part of the ‘cultural troupe, named Bangladesh Mukti Shangrami Shilpi Shangstha which used to travel to refugee camps and different areas in Mukta Anchal, to perform patriotic songs, arrange puppet shows and stage dramas to inspire the freedom fighters and refugees with the Spirit of Liberation.

Activity

Dance training
Lubna has spent a lifetime searching for the right artistic style of dance. Beginning with training in an avant-garde (innovative or pioneering) style of dance taught at the Bulbul Lalitkala Academy in Dhaka in the last century, she later trained in Bharatanatyam and Manipuri. After years she found refuge in Rabindranritta, a fusion of dance styles presented under the guidance of Nobel laureate poet Rabindranath Tagore. Since then, Lubna danced and choreographed on Rabithakur's compositions for most of her life. Additionally, she is trying to spread the message of universal brotherhood, which Rabindranath believed in.

Performance/Artistic Direction

Lubna has performed as Rabindranath's immortal character Radha in Lubna 'Bhanusinghe Padavali'; the courtesan dancer Shyama in the dance drama of the same name and Maya, Rabindranath's Chandal heroine Prakriti’s Mother, amongst others. She has been appreciated by the audiences at home and abroad in her role as Lokeshwari in 'Hey Ananta Punya' and Rani Ma in 'Tasher Desh'. Lubna has produced and directed Rabindranath's 'Chandalika', 'Hey Ananta Punya', 'Tasher Desh', 'Mayar Khel', 'Momo Manoshoshathi', 'Fireflies', 'Aay Amader Angone', 'Adda, Na Ki Naach', had worked in a total of about 30 productions, big and small, including ‘Hai Ramu' and Syed Shamsul Haque's 'Champaboti'.

Studies in Indian Aesthetics

Though trained in traditional forms of South Asian dance, Lubna has always been fascinated by dance as a tool for change. Intrinsically an introvert, Lubna remembers how dance, and later performance, gave wings to her even as a child. This inspired her to delve deeper into the meaning and purpose of dance as a transformative cultural practice, through her studies in Indian aesthetics. Her area of interest is Tantra - Kashmiri Shaivism, and Buddhist Vajrayana - and how these kinesthetic practices intersect with dance.

Ethnographic Activism

Lubna’s research on Buddhist Vajrayana ritual dance practices in Nepal enabled the extraordinary rediscovery of its connection with Bangladesh, while her systematic study of folk-dance practices in Bangladesh was instrumental in initiating several safeguarding measures to assure their continuity.

Cultural Activism through Shadhona

Lubna is part of a Trust that manages 'Shadhona - A Center for Advancement of Southasian Culture', through which diverse activities to preserve and enhance cultural practices of Bangladesh are run. From 1992, Shadhona has been 
 Creating and producing dance theatre – traditional, folk and contemporary.
 Working for the preservation and enhancement of 'intangible cultural heritage' through extensive research and documentation followed by safeguarding measures, especially for Manipuri dance practice in Bangladesh; preservation of lathikhela – a martial art of Bangladesh; strengthening folk ritual performances of Manasa Mangal; managing an on-line inventory of intangible cultural heritages (ICH) of Bangladesh; and working with policy makers to integrate ICH with Sustainable Development Goals 2030.
 Running various 'dance outreach' programs for children with special needs, people from marginalized communities etc. using various theatrical strategies like Forum Theatre, Feminist Dance Theatre, Performance Ethnography etc.
 Supporting dancers through training programs and scholarships.

Imparting training in dance and music through Kolpotoru

Lubna also runs 'Kolpotoru', a dance school she established in 2008.

Work Experience

Writings and Lectures on Culture
Lubna has presented papers on Culture of Bangladesh, specifically Dance Studies and Indigenous Performances, in several national and international seminars.

'

Publications
 ‘Children Cry Alone’, a research publication on the situation of sexual abuse of children in Bangladesh, based on a survey undertaken by ASK, in collaboration with several professional groups, as part of a UNESCAP project entitled ‘Elimination of Sexual Abuse and Exploitation of Youth Through Human Resources Development’; 2000.
 Marium, Lubna, A LONG ROAD TO JUSTICE: The role of courts and civil society in safeguarding women's human rights in Bangladesh, 2006; based on a report on ‘The Role of Courts and Civil Society in Safeguarding Women’s Human Rights in Bangladesh’ for an Ain-O-Shalish Kendro (ASK), Bangladesh - Chr. Michelsen Institute for Science and Intellectual Freedom (CMI), Norway project; June 2006.
 ‘Charyanrtya – Deho o moner shongjog’; Bangladesher Hridoy hote (Vol 1, Year 4, 1 Falgun, 1417.
 ‘Rabindranritya: An unfinished Experiment; Rabindranath Tagore: Reclaiming a Cultural Icon. Edited by Kathleen M. O’Connell and Joseph T. O’Connell. Kolkata: Visva-Bharati, 2009.
 'Restructuring Tradition - An Experiment in the Introduction of Performance Pedagogy in an Indigenous Performing Art of Bangladesh'; Folklore Across the Boundaries of the SAARC Region; Edited by K.Satchidanandan & Ajit Cour; Delhi, June 2010.
 ‘Understanding Creative Unity’; `Tagore Beyond Borders’; ICCR, Kolkata, 2010.
 ‘Rabindranrtyadhara’; Shardhoshoto borshe Rabindranath, Edited by Sanjida Khatun, Chhayanaut, Boishakh 1418, May 2011.
 Contributed with Video recording and commentary in ‘Shades of Difference’: Selected Writings of Tagore’; edited by Radha Chakravarthy; Delhi; 2015.
 'Performing Transformation', Indian Seminar (Delhi, India), April 2016.
Research Writings
 Completed a ‘Pilot ICH inventory Project’, by UNESCO (Dhaka), involving local communities and practitioners on a selected number of intangible cultural heritages of Bangladesh in 2017.
 Researched and revived Bengal’s martial dance, ‘Raibesh’ and the medieval dance form ‘Charya Nritya’ within dance practice of Bangladesh.
 Researched and worked with folk theatre companies performing the ritual theatre of Manasa Mangal.
 Researched ‘Lathikhela’ country-wide in 2010 – 2016.
Creative Writing
 Marium, Lubna. 2921. "Whimsies." In Golden: Bangladesh at 50 Contemporary Stories and Poems edited by Shazia Omar, by Shazia Omar and eds. Dhaka: UPL.

Awards 
 Shreshtho Nritto Shilpi’ (Best Dancer) award by Bangladesh Television in (1977)
 Bulbul Chowdhury award (2003)
 Biswaratna Dr Bhupen Hazarika International Solidarity Award (2013)
 SAARC Women’s Association award (2014)
 Zeenat Jahan Memorial Award (2015)
 Inspiring Women Award (2015)
 Recognition of Honor Award (2015)
 71 Foundation Shommanona Award (2016)
 Conferred Benuka Shommano Podok (2017)
 Prayas Sammanana Award (2018)
 Bangladesh Loko Shangskritik Shongshod Award (2018)
 Gunijan Shommanona (2018)
 Shilpakala Padak (2019)
 Poet Chandrabati Chayanika Women's Library Honorary Medal (2020)
 Nagad and Bangla Tribune ‘50 Years of Independence Award (2022)

References 

Bangladeshi female dancers
Living people
1954 births
Bangladeshi art directors
People of the Bangladesh Liberation War